This is a survey of the postage stamps and postal history of Ecuador.

Ecuador is a republic in South America, bordered by Colombia on the north, Peru on the east and south, and by the Pacific Ocean to the west.

First stamps
The first stamps of Ecuador were issued on 1 January 1865.

References

Further reading
Olamo, Juhani. The Revenue Stamps of Ecuador, YLE, Monistuspalvelu, Helsinki, 1994.

External links

ecuadorstamps.com

Philately of Ecuador